Satan's Slave may refer to:
 Satan's Slave (1976 film), a British independent supernatural horror film
 Satan's Slave (1980 film), an Indonesian horror film
 Satan's Slaves, a 2017 Indonesian horror film